Pseudoeurycea anitae, commonly known as Anita's false brook salamander or Anita's salamander, is a species of salamander in the family Plethodontidae. The specific name anitae honors Anita Smith, a resident of Oaxaca City who helped Charles Mitchill Bogert when he was collecting in the surroundings of the city. This species might already be extinct.

Description
The limbs are well developed with webbed fingers and toes. The head, the middle of the trunk, and the tail are dark brown in their upper surfaces, flanked by two irregular rows of dark spots or bars. The throat and venter are white, with faint mottling on the belly and the underside of the tail.

Habitat and conservation
Its natural habitats are pine-oak forests. It has been found in sinkholes, crevices and caves; it only occurs in moist places. It is threatened by habitat loss due to logging and development. The known habitat has largely disappeared and dried out. As of 2016, the species has not been observed since 1976, despite searches.

References

anitae
Endemic amphibians of Mexico
Fauna of the Sierra Madre del Sur
Amphibians described in 1967
Taxa named by Charles Mitchill Bogert
Taxonomy articles created by Polbot